Sensi (Senti, Tenti, Mananahua) is an extinct Panoan language, spoken on the right bank of the Ucayali River, Peru.

References

Panoan languages
Languages of Peru
Extinct languages of South America
Languages extinct in the 20th century